Gayle Brandeis (born April 14, 1968, in Chicago, Illinois) is the author of Fruitflesh: Seeds of Inspiration for Women Who Write (HarperOne), Dictionary Poems (Pudding House Publications), the novels The Book of Dead Birds (HarperCollins), which won Barbara Kingsolver's Bellwether Prize for Fiction in Support of a Literature of Social Change, Self Storage (Ballantine) and Delta Girls (Ballantine), and her first novel for young readers, My Life with the Lincolns (Holt). She has two books forthcoming in 2017, a collection of poetry, The Selfless Bliss of the Body, (Finishing Line Press) and a memoir, The Art of Misdiagnosis (Beacon Press)

Gayle's poetry, fiction and essays have appeared in numerous magazines and anthologies (such as Salon.com, The Nation, and The Mississippi Review) and have received several awards, including the QPB/Story Magazine Short Story Award, a Barbara Mandigo Kelly Peace Poetry Award, a grant from the Barbara Deming Memorial Fund, and a Notable Essay in Best American Essays 2016. Her essay on the meaning of liberty was one of three included in the Statue of Liberty's Centennial time capsule in 1986, when she was 18. In 2004, Writer Magazine honored Gayle with a Writer Who Makes a Difference Award.

Gayle holds a BA in "Poetry and Movement: Arts of Expression, Meditation and Healing" from the University of Redlands, and an MFA in Creative Writing/Fiction from Antioch University. Gayle currently teaches in the low residency MFA programs at Antioch University Los Angeles and Sierra Nevada College, where she was named distinguished visiting professor/writer in residence 2014–2015. She served as Inlandia Literary Laureate from 2012 to 2014, acting as literary ambassador to and for the Inland Empire region of Southern California. During her tenure, she worked extensively with the community, including at-risk youth, and edited the anthology ORANGELANDIA: The Literature of Inland Citrus. Gayle is currently editor in chief of Tiferet Journal and founding editor of Lady/Liberty/Lit. She is also mom to kids born in 1990, 1993 and 2009.

Books
Gayle Brandeis' major published works are:

 Dictionary Poems, 2002 Chapbook, Pudding House Publications
 Fruitflesh, 2002 Hardcover, 2004 Paperback, Harper San Francisco
 The Book of Dead Birds, 2003 Hardcover, 2004 Paperback, Harper Collins
 Self Storage, 2007 Hardcover, 2008 Paperback
 My Life With The Lincolns, 2010 Hardcover Henry Holt, 2010 Audio CD Listening Library
 Delta Girls, 2010 Paperback, Ballantine
 The Selfless Bliss of the Body, 2017 Paperback, Finishing Line Press
 The Art of Misdiagnosis, 2017 Hardcover, Beacon Press
 Many Restless Concerns: The Victims of Countess Bathory Speak in Chorus, 2020 Paperback, Black Lawrence Press
 Drawing Breath: Essays on Writing, the Body, and Loss, 2023 Paperback, Overcup Press

Publications
Gayle Brandeis' work has appeared in the following Publications:

 "Ice Town", Sports Literate
 "Thunder, Thighs”, The Rumpus
 "“The First Meeting of the People of Unintentional Color Support Group", The Butter 
 “Cherry Cherry Cherry”, Ghost Town
 “Dendrochronology: The Study of Rings”, The Manifest-Station
 "That’s My House," Saranac Review
 “Ghosts in the Ecotone”, Midnight Breakfast
 "Role/Model”, The Nervous Breakdown
 “Seafoam Salad”, Full Grown People
 "How Dare You?” The Manifest-Station
 “Where I Write: The House My Mother Built”, The Rumpus
 “‘My Sea’: A Personal Journey Through the Literature of the Salton Sea”, The Los Angeles Review of Books
 “‘Mad Men’ and Mom's Suicide”, Salon
 "Get Me Away From Here, I’m Dying", The Rumpus
 O Tin-nenbaum, Salon
 Hash browns, Salon
 Arin and Hannah's cold fusion atomic fireball tea, Salon
 Cold fusion, Salon
 Support Our Troops, The Nation
 MR 32/3 Politics & Religion, Mississippi Review
 Rapture, The Vestal Review
 Purple Couches, The Dogtown Review
 Purple Bananas, Nerve
 https://web.archive.org/web/20100530125830/http://www.mcsweeneys.net/2004/8/17contributors.html, McSweeney's Internet Tendency
 Beach House Bingo, California Authors
 Shoot, California Authors
 comfit, Clean Sheets
 Avocado, Clean Sheets
 Flotsam, Drunken Boat
 Baby Calls, In Posse
 Pillow Shams, Pindeldyboz
 Two, Brain Child
 Smoke Inhalation, Hip Mama
 A Long Time, Literary Mama
 The Real Minerva, Literary Mama
 Eyes in the Back of Her Head, Literary Mama
 Isinglass, Tattoo Highway
 The Gum Tree, Tattoo Highway
 Static Electricity, Tattoo Highway
 Edges, Green Tricycle
 Mouthing, Desires

Anthologies 
Gayle Brandeis' work has appeared in the following Anthologies:
Soulmate 101 and Other Essays on Love and Sex, Full Grown People
No Plot? No Problem!, Chronicle Books
Garden Blessings: Prose, Poems and Prayers Celebrating the Love of Gardening, Cleis Press
Gratitude Prayers: Prayers, Poems, and Prose for Everyday Thankfulness, Andrews McMeel Publishing
Sudden Flash Youth: 65 Short-Short Stories, Persea Press
The Maternal Is Political, Women Writers at the Intersection of Motherhood and Social Change (Seal Press)
You Have Time For This: Contemporary American Short-Short Stories, Ooligan Press
The Other Woman, Warner Books
American Wars: Illusions And Realities, Clarity Press
The Future Dictionary Of America, McSweeney's
The Imperfect Mom: Candid Confessions of Mothers Living in the Real World, Broadway Books
Roar Softly And Carry A Great Lipstick: 28 Women Writers On Life, Sex And Survival, Inner Ocean
It's A Boy: Women Writers On Raising Sons, Seal Press
It's A Girl: Women Writers On Raising Daughters, Seal Press
Literary Mama: Reading For The Maternally Inclined, Seal Press
The Knitter's Gift: An Inspirational Bag of Words, Wisdom, and Craft, Adams Media
Mischief, Caprice, & Other Poetic Strategies, Red Hen Press
Fresh Milk: The Secret Life Of Breasts, Simon & Schuster
Fresh Water: Poems From The Rivers, Lakes And Streams, Pudding House Publications
Proposing On The Brooklyn Bridge: Poems About Marriage, Grayson Books
Henry’s Creature: Poems And Stories On The Automobile, Black Moss Press
2000: Here’s To Humanity, The People's Press
The Spirit Of Pregnancy: An Interactive Anthology for Your Journey to Motherhood, Contemporary Books
Breeder: Real-Life Stories from the New Generation of Mothers, Seal Press
Jane's Stories II: An Anthology By Midwestern Women, Wild Dove Press
Essential Love: Poems About Mothers And Fathers, Daughters And Sons, Poetworks
Jewish Mothers Tell Their Stories: Acts Of Love And Courage, The Haworth Press
The Oy Of Sex: Jewish Women Write Erotica, Cleis Press
Family Celebrations: Prayers, Poems, and Toasts For Every Occasion, (Andrews McMeel)
Those Who Can... Teach!: Celebrating Teachers Who Make a Difference, Wildcat Canyon Press
Heal Your Soul, Heal the World: Prayers and Poems to Comfort, Inspire, and Connect Humanity, Andrews McMeel
Eating Our Hearts Out: Personal Accounts of Women's Relationship to Food, The Crossing Press
Vegetarian Pregnancy: The Definitive Nutritional Guide to Having a Healthy Baby, McBooks Press
Our Mothers, Ourselves: Writers and Poets Celebrating Motherhood, Bergin & Garvey
The Breast: An Anthology, Global City Press
Pandemonium: Or, Life with Kids, Hysteria Publications
Which Lilith?: Feminist Writers Re-Create The World’s First Woman, Jacob Aronson

Honors 
Notable Essay, The Best American Essays 2016
"Climbing at Joshua Tree" poem selected by United States Department of the Interior to be installed in the Joshua Tree National Park Visitor Center, 2016
Pushcart Prize Nomination, Full Grown People, 2014
Inlandia Literary Laureate, 2012-2014
Writer in Residence, Riverside Art Museum, 2012-2014
Silver Nautilus Book Award, My Life with the Lincolns, 2012
Read On Wisconsin selection, My Life with the Lincolns, January, 2011
Women of Distinction, Girl Scouts of San Gorgonio Council, 2008
Breakout Book, Target's Bookmarked Program (February, 2008, paperback release of Self Storage)
Special Mention, Pushcart Prize, 2007
Arts Honoree, City of Riverside, 2007
Nomination, Pushcart Prize, Amazon Shorts, 2006
Notable Story of 2005, Million Writers Short Story Award, 2006
Honorable Mention, Thomas Merton Poetry of the Sacred Competition, 2006
Keynote Speaker, Conference on Gender and Culture, Oregon State U., 2006
Writer Who Makes a Difference Award, The Writer Magazine, 2004
Pushcart Prize Nomination, The Vestal Review, 2004
Keynote Speaker, National Association for Women Writers Conference, 2004
Notable Book, Kirayama Pacific Rim Book Prize, The Book of Dead Birds, 2004
BookSense selection, American Booksellers Association, The Book of Dead Birds, 2003
Bellwether Prize for Fiction in Support of a Literature of Social Change, The Book of Dead Birds, 2002
BookSense selection, American Booksellers Association, Fruitflesh, 2002
Second Place, 24-Hour Short Story Contest, Writers Weekly, 2002
Graduation Speaker, Antioch University, 2001.
First Place, Inscriptions Force of Nature Poetry Contest, 2001.
Money for Women/Barbara Deming Memorial Fund grant, 1999.
Winner, Art on the Air/Inventing the Invisible "Vision" Poetry Award, 1999.
Winner, 1998 Quality Paperback Book Club/Story Magazine Short Story Award.
Finalist, Icarus Poetry Competition, 1998.
Finalist, Flash Fiction Competition, 1998.
Finalist, Shenango Rivers Press Prose Chapbook Competition, 1998.
Editor's Choice Award in Fiction, Scarlet Apple Enterprises,  1997.
Second Place, The Empty Shelf Fiction Contest, 1997.
Barbara Mandigo Kelly Peace Poetry Award, sponsored by Nuclear Age Peace Foundation, 1996.
Grand Prize, "Mini Plays" play writing contest sponsored by Lake Arrowhead Performing Arts Company, 1995.
First Place, "Poetry in Motion" contest sponsored by Chaparral Poets, 1993.
PEN American Center Grant, 1993.
Phi Beta Kappa, 1990.

References

External links
Official website
Harper Collins Author Page
Ballantine Author Page

Living people
21st-century American novelists
Antioch University alumni
University of Redlands alumni
Writers from Chicago
Writers from Riverside, California
Sustainability advocates
1968 births
American women novelists
21st-century American women writers
21st-century American essayists
Novelists from Illinois
Novelists from California
American women essayists